Mangsir is the eighth month in the Bikram Samwat, the official Nepali calendar. This month coincides with the mid-November to mid-December of the Gregorian calendar.

Important events during this month include:
Mangshir purnima (Full Moon), Udhauli (public holiday), Chhath (it usually falls in Kartik but in 2015 it fell in Mangsir)

Months in the Nepali calendar

References 

 Nepali Calendar 2074
 New Nepali Calendar 2074
 Nepali Calendar

Nepali calendar